Sesayap River is a river in Borneo island, flowing in North Kalimantan Province, Indonesia. It forms a delta which has islands including Bunyu and Tarakan Island.

Geography 
The river flows in the northeastern area of Borneo island with predominantly tropical rainforest climate (designated as Af in the Köppen-Geiger climate classification). The annual average temperature in the area is 22 °C. The warmest month is April, when the average temperature is around 23 °C, and the coldest is December, at 22 °C. The average annual rainfall is 4020 mm. The wettest month is October, with an average of 438 mm rainfall, and the driest is June, with 263 mm rainfall.

See also
List of rivers of Indonesia
List of rivers of Kalimantan

References

Rivers of North Kalimantan
Rivers of Indonesia